Hans Tisdall (nee Aufseeser, 14 August 1910 – 31 January 1997), was a German-born artist, who worked in the UK as a designer and teacher. He is largely remembered for his bookjacket and textile designs.

After training in Munich and Berlin, Aufseeser moved to Paris and then London. He changed his name to Tisdall in around 1940, marrying the journalist and Tamesa Fabrics founder Isabel Tisdall in 1941.

Career
Hans Tisdall made his name in the 1930s as a textile designer with Edinburgh Weavers. In the 1960s, he created many designs for Tamesa Fabrics – working alongside designers such as Marianne Straub. Fabrics woven at Warner & Sons were used for a number of prestigious commercial projects.

Tisdall was among the designers who contributed to the Festival of Britain in 1951, winning the competition to design the entrance to the funfair at Battersea Park's pleasure gardens.

From the 1950s on, Tisdall also became known for creating bookjackets, notably for Jonathan Cape. A typeface based on his brushstroke style, known as Tisdall Script, was created by Michael Harvey in 2001. Another typeface called Blesk, loosely based on his lettering for books by Ivor Brown, was created in 2015.

Tisdall taught at Central School (now University of the Arts) from 1947 to 1962, initially in the textile department and later in the school of painting.

Works
Of Tisdall's paintings, Moorings at Kew and two still lifes are in the collection of Manchester Art Gallery and  Hastings is part of the collection of Pallant House Gallery in Chichester. Some of his textile designs are held at the Warner Textile Archive in Braintree. A small selection of his designs is held by University of the Arts.

Exhibitions
A retrospective of Tisdall's work was held at The Pride Gallery in London in 1988 and at the Galerie Vömel in Düsseldorf shortly before his wife's death in 2007.

Books
 Hans Tisdall: A Retrospective, The Pride Gallery, 1988, .

References

External links
 Art UK

1910 births
1997 deaths
Artists from Munich
German emigrants to the United Kingdom
Textile designers
German designers
German illustrators
Academics of the University of the Arts London